The Cambodia women's national field hockey team represents Cambodia in international field hockey competitions.

Tournament history

Women's AHF Cup

 Champions   Runners up   Third place   Fourth place

Hockey World League

 Champions   Runners up   Third place   Fourth place

'

References 

Asian women's national field hockey teams
Field hockey
National team